James E. Rzepkowski (born March 8, 1971 in Annapolis, Maryland) was a member of the Maryland House of Delegates.

Background
Prior to working as a State Delegate, Rzepkowski worked as an insurance agent manager for State Farm insurance. In 1992 he began his political career when he worked for the Republican State Central Committee.

Education
Rzepkowski graduated from Old Mill High School in Millersville, Maryland, which is in Anne Arundel County. He attended the University of Maryland College Park and received his B.A. in government & politics in 1993 receiving Phi Beta Kappa. Additionally, Rzepkowski was the charter president of the Eta Epsilon chapter of Pi Kappa Phi fraternity at the University of Maryland.

Career
Rzepkowski was first elected in 1994 when, along with fellow Republican Michael W. Burns and Democrat Mary Ann Love, he defeated Democratic incumbent Victor A. Sulin.  In 1998, Rzepkowski won reelection along with Love and Theodore J. Sophocleus     The general election in 2002 was identical to 1998 with all three incumbents winning reelection.

Rzepkowski resigned his seat on April 30, 2003 to accept a position with the Department of Business and Economic Development. Terry R. Gilleland, Jr. was appointed by Governor Bob Ehrlich to replace Rzepkowski as the delegate for District 32.

While in the Maryland House of Delegates, Rzepkowski was the Chief Deputy Minority Whip in 2003.

Election results
2002 Race for Maryland House of Delegates – District 32
Voters to choose three:
{| class="wikitable"
|-
!Name
!Votes
!Percent
!Outcome
|-
|-
|James E. Rzepkowski, Rep.
|18,299
|  19.84%
|   Won
|-
|-
|Theodore Sophocleus, Dem.
|16,842
|  18.26%
|   Won
|-
|-
|Mary Ann Love, Dem.
|16,646
|  18.05%
|   Won
|-
|-
|Robert G. Pepersack, Sr, Rep.
|14,628
|  15.86%
|   Lost
|-
|-
|Victor A. Sulin, Dem.
|13,694
|  14.85%
|   Lost
|-
|-
|David P. Starr, Rep.
|12,020
|  13.04%
|   Lost
|-
|Other Write-Ins
|82
|  0.09%
|   Lost
|}

1998 Race for Maryland House of Delegates – District 32
Voters to choose three:
{| class="wikitable"
|-
!Name
!Votes
!Percent
!Outcome
|-
|-
|Mary Ann Love, Dem.
|15,823
|  19%
|   Won
|-
|-
|Theodore Sophocleus, Dem.
|15,382
|  18%
|   Won
|-
|-
|James E. Rzepkowski, Rep.
|14,959
|  18%
|   Won
|-
|-
|Michael W. Burns, Rep.
|13,247
|  16%
|   Lost
|-
|-
|Victor Sulin, Dem.
|12,658
|  15%
|   Lost
|-
|-
|Betty Ann O'Neill, Dem.
|11,752
|  14%
|   Lost
|-
|}

1994 Race for Maryland House of Delegates – District 32
Voters to choose three:
{| class="wikitable"
|-
!Name
!Votes
!Percent
!Outcome
|-
|-
|James E. Rzepkowski, Rep.
|15,147
|  20%
|   Won
|-
|-
|Michael W. Burns, Rep.
|12,883
|  17%
|   Won
|-
|-
|Mary Ann Love, Dem.
|12,414
|  16%
|   Won
|-
|-
|Gerald P. Starr, Rep.
|12,166
|  16%
|   Lost
|-
|-
|Victor A. Sulin, Dem.
|11,872
|  16%
|   Lost
|-
|-
|Thomas H. Dixon III, Dem.
|11,002
|  15%
|   Lost
|-
|}

External links
 http://archive1.mdarchives.state.md.us/msa/mdmanual/06hse/former/html/msa12303.html

References and notes

1971 births
Living people
Members of the Maryland House of Delegates
University of Maryland, College Park alumni
Politicians from Annapolis, Maryland